Clipse Presents: Re-Up Gang is the only studio album by the American rap group Re-Up Gang. It was released through Koch Records. Recording sessions took place at Hovercraft Studios in Virginia Beach, Virginia. Production was handled by The Sleepwalkers, Karl Maceo, Illfonics, J. Storm, Johnny Fuego, and Scott Storch, with the Clipse serving as executive producers. 
The group had previously appeared on the We Got It 4 Cheap mixtapes. The first single, "Fast Life" featured half of the Re-Up Gang, the Clipse. The album features Clipse and the other two members of the Re-Up Gang, Ab-Liva and Sandman. The album peaked at number 55 on the Billboard 200, number eight on the Top R&B/Hip-Hop Albums, number five on the Top Rap Albums, and number seven on the Independent Albums.

Track listing

Charts

References

2008 albums
Clipse albums
MNRK Music Group albums
Albums produced by Scott Storch